The Saginaw Bay Yacht Club is situated on the Eastern shore of the Saginaw River about a mile and a half (2.4 km) from Saginaw Bay and Lake Huron, Michigan.

Establishment
Established as The Bay City Boat and Fishing Club in 1894, it is one of the oldest clubs on the Great Lakes.  The name was changed to the Saginaw Bay Yacht Club in 1924. The present Clubhouse was built in 1960.  The Club has a full-service restaurant and bar open during the boating season.  Guest docks are available and reciprocity is honored through the Inter-Lake Yachting Association and the American Registry of Yacht Clubs.  Complete commercial marine facilities are located nearby.

History
The Club was originally called the Bay City Boating and Fishing Club, and was founded in the summer of 1894 by William Jennison and 109 other enthusiastic charter members. A Clubhouse erected on pilings on the Saginaw River at the foot of Scheurmann Street in Essexville, Michigan; it opened in January 1895.

At the time, lumbering was king in the Saginaw Valley. Forty sawmills lined the banks of the Saginaw River from the mouth to above Bay City, and the pungent odors of freshly cut white pine and hemlock were ever present. Heavy traffic of steam tugs, tow barges leaving the mills with finished lumber, as well as incoming tugs towing log rafts or barges loaded with logs from lumbering areas, had to be a challenge as well as a hazard for the yachtsmen navigating the river. Sail and steamboats navigated their way up and down river. Activity slowed in 1898 after Ontario, Canada decreed that all timber cut on Crown lands must stay in Canada, cutting supplies for the mills significantly. Some mills along the Saginaw River closed and some moved further north.

The small Clubhouse was rapidly outgrown. With a shortage of mooring space, the Club members decided to move downriver and move their Clubhouse, plus add a new facility. A membership meeting voted unanimously to proceed with plans, provided that the membership could be increased to 150. This was quickly accomplished. 

The small Clubhouse was transported over the winter ice to the new site. Henry Webber, a building contractor, was hired to construct a new building alongside it. Completion date was set for July 1, 1904. An artist's rendition of the new Clubhouse appeared in the Bay City Tribune newspaper on May 5, 1904; the membership anticipated the best boating and social season ever. A grand opening of the beautiful 40' x 50' Victorian building was held on July 8, 1904.

A number of pilings were driven in the river in front of the Clubhouse and floats attached with chain for boat moorings. Occasionally, strong northerly storms scattered the fleet, sinking some boats at their moorings. Between 1952 and 1956, basins were dredged on the north and south sides of the Clubhouse, 600' (182m) long by 150' (46m) wide and eleven feet deep, eliminating further damage to the fleet.

The day came when the Club building was in dire need of repairs. The pilings it rested on had been shifted by the ice and were deteriorating. The floors were badly warped by previous flooding and the upper balcony had been closed for some time due to its poor condition. 

In 1959, the old building was demolished, and a new Club constructed, featuring the latest in modern facilities and conveniences. The grand opening was held in conjunction with the Commodores' Ball in April 1960. The Saginaw Bay Yacht Club continues to grow and improve its facilities to maintain its reputation as one of the finest Clubs on the Great Lakes.

2022 is the 128th year of continuous operation of the Saginaw Bay Yacht Club on the shores of the Saginaw River.

Club Officers

2022 Flag Officers
Commodore Richard Fletcher
Vice Commodore Dennis Bess
Rear Commodore  Jerry Preston
Treasurer J. Michael Butts
Secretary Mary Ann Cole
Past Commodore  David Klippert

2022 Board of Directors

 Terry Bernelis
 Michael Bouckaert
 Tari Detzler
 John Hebert
 Julie Humbert
 Ann Lazarro
 James Nichols
 Neil Oldenburg
 Steve Spaulding
 Louise Vozniak

Club Management
General manager - 
Business Manager - Ashley Van Akker

Notes

1894 establishments in Michigan
Saginaw Bay
Saginaw River
Sailing in Michigan
Yacht clubs in the United States